Țițești is a commune in Argeș County, Muntenia, Romania. It is composed of five villages: Bucșenești-Lotași, Cișmea, Țițești, Valea Mănăstirii and Valea Stânii.

References

Communes in Argeș County
Localities in Muntenia